Polititapes is a genus of marine bivalve molluscs in the subfamily Tapetinae  of the family Veneridae, commonly known as carpet shells.

Taxonomy
This species and allied are usually held in Venerupis but this is not unequivocally supported; Huber (2010) is here followed in using Polititapes as valid genus, awaiting a much needed phylogenetic revision of the group. Polititapes was published February, 1900 and therefore has priority over Callistotapes Sacco, 1900 (published April 29, 1900) in case they are considered synonyms.

Species
 Polititapes aureus (Gmelin, 1791)
 Polititapes durus (Gmelin, 1791)
 Polititapes lucens (Locard, 1886)
 Polititapes merklini (Goncharova, 1986) †
 Polititapes modesta (Dubois, 1831) †
 Polititapes parvovalis Zettler & Alf, 2021
 Polititapes rhomboides (Pennant, 1777)
Synonyms
 Polititapes virgineus (Linnaeus, 1767) sensu auct. : synonym of Polititapes rhomboides (Pennant, 1777) (misapplication)

References

 Chiamenti, A. (1900). Contribuzione alio studio della Malacofauna Adriatica. Nota sulla famiglia della Veneridae, e della Petricolidae. Rivista Italiana di Scienze Naturali. 20(1-2): 9-15.
 Huber, M. (2010). Compendium of bivalves. A full-color guide to 3,300 of the world's marine bivalves. A status on Bivalvia after 250 years of research. Hackenheim: ConchBooks. 901 pp., 1 CD-ROM.

External links
 Sacco, F. (1900). I molluschi dei terreni terziarii del Piemonte e della Liguria. Parte XXVIII. (Isocardiidae, Cyprinidae, Veneridae, Petricolidae, Cyrenidae e Sphaeridae). Carlo Clausen, Torino, 98 pp, 14 pl.
 Dall, W. H. (1902). Synopsis of the family Veneridae and of the North American Recent species. Proceedings of the United States National Museum. 26 (1312): 335-412.

Veneridae
Bivalve genera